Sunfield is an unincorporated community in Perry County, Illinois, United States. An F5 tornado struck 1 mile north of the village at the US Route 51/State Route 154 intersection on December 18, 1957, killing three people.

References

Unincorporated communities in Perry County, Illinois
Unincorporated communities in Illinois